Flusoxolol is a selective beta-1 receptor blocker.

References

Beta blockers
Fluoroarenes
N-isopropyl-phenoxypropanolamines